Freeman Creek Grove is a grove of giant sequoias located in Giant Sequoia National Monument in the Sierra Nevada in eastern California. The area is a botanical reserve under administration by the Sequoia National Forest, except for one small inholding. Freeman Creek itself is a tributary of the Kern River.

Noteworthy trees
There are several large sequoias in this grove, including:
Named by Bill Croft in 1988, this is the 29th or 28th largest giant sequoia in the world. The exact location of the tree is not publicly known.
 President George H. W. Bush Tree: This tree was named to commemorate the Presidential Proclamation delivered and signed by President George H. W. Bush to protect, preserve and restore all of the sequoia groves on National Forest System lands throughout the Sierra Nevada. Bush delivered and signed the proclamation while standing beside the tree in 1992.
 Castro Tree: A telescope giant sequoia.

See also
List of giant sequoia groves
Evans Grove

References

Kern River
Rivers of the Sierra Nevada (United States)
Rivers of Tulare County, California
Geography of the San Joaquin Valley
Giant sequoia groves
Giant Sequoia National Monument
Rivers of Northern California
Rivers of the Sierra Nevada in California